Lawrence "Bud" Freeman (April 13, 1906 – March 15, 1991) was an American jazz musician, bandleader, and composer, known mainly for playing tenor saxophone, but also the clarinet.

Biography
In 1922, Freeman and some friends from high school formed the Austin High School Gang. Freeman played the C melody saxophone with band members such as Jimmy McPartland and Frank Teschemacher. before switching to tenor saxophone two years later. The band was influenced by the New Orleans Rhythm Kings and Louis Armstrong. While Armstrong was in King Oliver's Creole Jazz Band, Freeman attended performances at Lincoln Gardens with McPartland. They were nicknamed "Alligators".

In 1927, he moved to New York City, where he worked as a session musician and band member with Red Nichols, Roger Wolfe Kahn, Ben Pollack, and Joe Venuti. One of his most notable performances was a solo on Eddie Condon's 1933 recording, The Eel, which became Freeman's nickname for his long snake-like improvisations. Freeman played with Tommy Dorsey's Orchestra (1936–1938) and Benny Goodman's band in 1938, before forming the Summa Cum Laude Orchestra (1939–1940). Freeman joined the U.S. Army during World War II and headed a U.S. Army band in the Aleutian Islands.

After the war, Freeman returned to New York and led his own groups. He also worked with Buck Clayton, Ruby Braff, Vic Dickenson, and Jo Jones. In 1960, he wrote the book and lyrics  for the Broadway musical Beg, Borrow or Steal, which included the ballad "Zen Is When", later recorded by the Dave Brubeck Quartet on Jazz Impressions of Japan (1964). He was a member of the World's Greatest Jazz Band in 1969 and 1970. In 1974, he moved to England and continued to record and perform. Freeman spent some time on the Isle of Man and was a guest of Manx musician Jim Caine. After returning to Chicago in 1980, he continued to work into his eighties.

He wrote two memoirs (You Don't Look Like a Musician (1974) and If You Know of a Better Life, Please Tell Me (1976)) and an autobiography (Crazeology) with Robert Wolf. In 1992, Freeman was inducted into the Big Band and Jazz Hall of Fame.

Death
Freeman died March 15, 1991, at the Warren Barr Pavilion, a nursing home in Chicago. He was 84 years old. His death came days after the March 13 demise of Austin High School Gang member, Jimmy McPartland.

Discography
 Comes Jazz (Columbia, 1950)
 Battle of Jazz, Vol. 1 (Brunswick, 1953)
 Bud Freeman and the Chicagoans (Paramount, 1954)
 Test of Time (Bethlehem, 1955)
 Bud Freeman (Bethlehem, 1955)
 Midnight at Eddie Condon's (Emarcy, 1955)
 Jazz: Chicago Style (Columbia, 1955)
 Bud Freeman and His All-Star Jazz (Harmony, 1957)
 The Bud Freeman Group (Stere-O-Craft, 1957)
 Chicago/Austin High School Jazz in Hi-Fi (BMG Ariola, 1957)
 Bud Freeman & His Summa Cum Laude Trio (Dot, 1958)
 The Bud Freeman All-Stars featuring Shorty Baker (Swingville, 1960) with Shorty Baker
 Midnight Session (Dot, 1960) with Mary Mulligan
 Summer Concert 1960 (Jazz Archives, 1960)
 Something to Remember You By (Black Lion, 1962)
 Chicago (Black Lion, 1962)
 Something Tender (United Artists, 1963)
 The Compleat Bud Freeman (Monmouth, 1970)
 The Joy of Sax (Chiaroscuro, 1974)
 Jazz Meeting in Holland (Circle, 1975)
 Song of the Tenor (Philips, 1975)
 Two Beautiful (Circle, 1976)
 Bucky and Bud (Flying Dutchman, 1976)
 Live in Harlem (Cat, 1978)
 California Session (Jazzology, 1982)
 The Real Bud Freeman (1984) (Principally Jazz, 1985)
 Superbud (Jazzology, 1992)

With Rex Stewart and Cootie Williams
The Big Challenge (Jazztone, 1957)
With George Wein
Newport Jazz Festival All Stars (Atlantic, 1959 [1960]) with Buck Clayton, Pee Wee Russell, Vic Dickenson, Champ Jones and Jake Hanna
George Wein & the Newport All-Stars (Impulse!, 1962)

References

External links
 Guide to the Roger Isaacs Collection of Bud Freeman Papers 1918-1995 at the University of Chicago Special Collections Research Center 
 Bud Freeman: Profile in Jazz Syncopatedtimes.com
 Bud Freeman recordings at the Discography of American Historical Recordings.

1906 births
1991 deaths
Musicians from Chicago
Jazz musicians from Illinois
20th-century American male musicians
20th-century clarinetists
20th-century American saxophonists
American expatriates in the United Kingdom
American jazz bandleaders
American jazz clarinetists
American jazz tenor saxophonists
American male jazz musicians
American male saxophonists
Dixieland jazz musicians
Jewish American musicians
United States Army Band musicians
World's Greatest Jazz Band members
Chiaroscuro Records artists
Columbia Records artists
EmArcy Records artists
Majestic Records artists
20th-century American Jews